The discography of Lianne La Havas, an English singer and songwriter, consists of three studio albums, seven extended plays, thirteen singles and eleven music videos. Born in London her career began after being introduced to various musicians and singer Paloma Faith, for whom she sang backing vocals. In 2010, Lianne signed to Warner Bros. Records, spending two years developing her songwriting before releasing any music.

Her debut studio album, Is Your Love Big Enough?, was released in July 2012, peaking at number 4 on the UK Albums Chart. The album was released to positive reviews from critics and earned her a nomination for the BBC's Sound of 2012 poll and awards for the iTunes Album of The Year 2012. The album includes the singles "No Room for Doubt", "Forget", "Lost & Found", "Is Your Love Big Enough?" and "Age".

Her second studio album, Blood, was released in July 2015, peaking at number 2 on the UK Albums Chart. The album includes the singles "Unstoppable" and "What You Don't Do".

Studio albums

Extended plays

Singles

Other appearances

Music videos

Notes

References

External links 
 

Discographies of British artists
Pop music discographies